Sembuwatta Lake ( sinhala: සෙම්ඹුවත්ත ) is a tourist attraction situated at Elkaduwa in the Matale District of Sri Lanka, adjacent to the Campbell's Lane Forest Reserve. Sembuwatta Lake is a man-made lake created from natural spring water. Alongside the lake is a natural swimming pool.

Currently the lake belongs to the Elkaduwa Plantations and produces electricity for the nearby villagers. The lake and surrounds were renovated by Radley Dissage, the Elkaduwa Plantations estate superintendent, who connected the lake to nearby water fountains.

Rferences

Reservoirs in Sri Lanka
Populated places in Matale District
Lakes of Sri Lanka